Stolidobranchia is an order of tunicates in the class Ascidiacea. The group includes both colonial and solitary animals. They are distinguished from other tunicates by the presence of folded pharyngeal baskets. This provides the etymology of their name: in ancient Greek,  means the "fold" of a cloth. Stolidobranchian sea squirts are also characterized by the complete absence of an abdomen. The abdominal organs of other tunicates are instead located to one side of the pharyngeal basket in this group.

Taxonomy
Molgulidae Lacaze-Duthiers 1877 [Hexacrobylidae Seeliger 1906; Caesiridae]
Anomopera Hartmeyer, 1923
Asajirus Kott, 1989 [Hexadactylus Monniot & Monniot 1990]
Bostrichobranchus Traustedt, 1883
Eugyra Alder & Hancock, 1870 [Eugyrioides Seeliger 1907]
Fungulus Herdman, 1882
Gamaster Pizon, 1896
Minipera Monniot & Monniot, 1974
Molgula Forbes, 1848 [Anurella Lacaze-Duthiers 1877; Ascopera Herdman 1881; Astropera Pizon 1898; Caesira Flemming 1822; Ctenicella Lacaze-Duthiers 1877; Cystingia MacLeay 1825; Eugyriopsis Roule 1885; Euritteria Huntsman 1922; Gymnocystis Giard 1872; Lithonephria Giard 1872; Lithonephrya Giard 1872; Meristocarpus Pizon 1899; Molgulidium Seeliger 1907; Molgulina Hartmeyer 1914; Pera Stimpson 1852; Syphonotethis Gervais 1840; Xenomolgula Ärnbäck 1931]
Molguloides Huntsman, 1922
Namiella Monniot & Monniot, 1968
Oligotrema Bourne, 1903 [Gasterascidia Monniot & Monniot 1968; Hexacrobylus Sluiter 1905; Sorbera Monniot & Monniot 1974]
Paramolgula Traustedt, 1835 [Stomatropa]
Pareugyrioides Hartmeyer, 1914 
Protomolgula Monniot, 1971
Rhizomolgula Ritter, 1901
Pyuridae Hartmeyer 1908 [Plidaeuridae]
Bathypera Michaelsen, 1904 [Halomolgula Ritter 1907]
Bathypyura Monniot & Monniot, 1973
Boltenia Savigny, 1816
Bolteniopsis Harant, 1927 [Liouvillea Sluiter 1929]
Claudenus Kott, 1998 [Ctenicella Kott 1972]
Cratostigma Monniot & Monniot, 1961
Ctenyura Van Name, 1918
Culeolus Herdman, 1881
Halocynthia Verrill, 1879 [Cynthia Savigny 1816; Holocynthia Verrill 1879; Tethyum Bohadsch 1761]
Hartmeyeria Ritter, 1913 [Ectorchis Huntsman 1922]
Hemistyela Millar, 1955
Herdmania Lahille, 1888 [Rhabdocynthia Herdman 1891]
Heterostigma Ärnbäck-Christie-Linde, 1924
Microcosmus Heller, 1877
Paraculeolus Vinogradova, 1970
Pyura Molina, 1782 [Cynthiopsis Michaelsen 1904; Forbesella Lacaze-Duthiers & Delage 1892; Forbesia Lacaze-Duthiers & Delage 1892; Hyalocynthia Oka 1930; Paracynthia Ärnbäck 1938; Podocynthia Oka 1929; Pyuropsis Michaelsen 1912]
Pyurella Monniot & Monniot, 1973
Styelidae Sluiter 1895 [Botryllidae Giard 1875]  
Alloeocarpa Michaelsen, 1900
Arnbackia Brewin, 1950
Asterocarpa Brewin, 1946
Bathyoncus Herdman, 1882
Bathystyeloides Seeliger, 1907
Berillia Brewin, 1952
Botryllocarpa Hartmeyer, 1909 [Protobotryllus Pizon 1908]
Botrylloides Milne-Edwards, 1841 [Metrocarpa Ärnbäck-Christie-Linde 1923; Sarcobotrylloides Drasche 1883]
Botryllus Gaertner, 1774 [Alcyonium Pallas 1766; Myxobotrus Oka 1931; Parabotryllus Kott 1975; Polycyclus Lamarck 1815]
Chorizocarpa Michaelsen, 1904
Cnemidocarpa Huntsman, 1913 [Azygocarpa Oka 1932; Ypsilocarpa Ärnbäck 1922]
Dendrodoa MacLeay, 1824 [Styelopsis Traustedt 1883]
Dextrocarpa Millar, 1955
Diandrocarpa Van Name, 1902
Dicarpa Millar, 1955
Distomus Gaertner, 1774 [Psilostyela Sluiter 1927]
Eusynstyela Michaelsen, 1904 [Michaelsenia Van Name 1902]
Gynandrocarpa Michaelsen, 1900
Kukenthalia Hartmeyer, 1903
Metandrocarpa Michaelsen, 1904 [Okamia Brewin 1948]
Monandrocarpa Michaelsen, 1904 [Monoandrocarpa Kott 1972]
Oculinaria Gray, 1868
Oligocarpa Hartmeyer, 1911
Pelonaia Forbes & Goodsir, 1841
Podostyela
Polyandrocarpa Michaelsen, 1904
Polycarpa Heller, 1877 [Glandula Stimpson 1852; Pandocia Fleming 1822; Paratona Huntsman 1913; Styeloides]
Polyzoa Lesson, 1831 [Chorizocormus Herdman 1886; Dictyostyela Oka 1926; Goodsiria Cunningham 1871; Monobotryllus (Agassiz 1880)]
Protostyela Millar, 1954
Psammobotrus Oka, 1932
Psammostyela Weinstein, 1961
Seriocarpa Diehl, 1969
Stolonica Lacaze-Duthiers & Délage, 1892 [Amphicarpa Michaelsen 1922; Thylacium Alder & Hancock 1907]
Styela Fleming, 1822 [Botryorchis Huntsman 1911; Clavellinopsis Fewkes 1889; Goniocarpa Huntsman 1912; Katatropa Huntsman 1912; Minostyela Kott 1969; Molstyela Oka 1934; Redikorzevia Oka 1929; Vannamea Oka 1932]
Symplegma Herdman, 1886
Syncarpa Redikorzev, 1913
Theodorella Michaelsen, 1922
Tibitin Monniot, 1983

References

 
Chordate orders
Taxa named by Fernando Lahille